Meant for Each Other is a collaborative studio album by American country music artists Lee Greenwood and Barbara Mandrell. The album was released on August 6, 1984, by MCA Records and was produced by Tom Collins. It was the first and only collaboration effort between Greenwood and Mandrell.

Background and content 
Meant for Each Other was recorded at the Woodland Sound Studio December 1983 in Nashville, Tennessee, United States. The album consisted of 10 duets performed by Lee Greenwood and Barbara Mandrell. The album's fifth track, "We Were Meant for Each Other" was written by Greenwood and also served as the album's title track. The opening track, "To Me" was co-written by Mike Reid, who also was a National Football League player in the early 1970s. Most of the album's material contained a country pop arrangement for most of the tracks. Meant for Each Other was released on an original LP album upon its release in 1984, with five songs included on each side of the record.

Meant for Each Other received three out of five stars by Allmusic, without a review provided.

Release 
Meant for Each Other'''s lead single, "To Me" was released in July 1984. The single became a Top 5 hit, reaching #3 on the Billboard Magazine Hot Country Singles & Tracks chart and #24 on the Billboard Hot Adult Contemporary Tracks chart. In addition, the song also peaked at #5 on the Canadian RPM Country Tracks chart. The second and final single released was "It Should Have Been Love by Now" in January 1985. The song became a Top 20 hit, reaching #19 on Billboards Country Singles chart and #35 on Billboards Hot Adult Contemporary Tracks chart. The single also peaked at #12 on the Canadian Country chart. Meant for Each Other was released in 1984, peaking at #5 on the Billboard Magazine'' Top Country Albums chart and #89 on the Billboard 200 albums chart.

Track listing

Personnel
As noted at allmusic
Barbara Mandrell and Lee Greenwood - lead vocals
Cindy Richardson, Lisa Silver - backing vocals
Diane Tidwell - synthesizers, backing vocals
David Briggs, Bobby Ogdin - piano and synthesizers
Alan Steinberger - synthesizers
Peter Bordonali, Steve Gibson, Reggie Young - guitar
David Hungate, Jack Williams - bass
Eddie Bayers - drums
Terry McMillan - percussion, harmonica
Quitman Dennis, Donald Sanders - saxophone
Wayne Jackson - trombone, trumpet

Charts

Weekly charts

Year-end charts

Singles

References 

1984 albums
Barbara Mandrell albums
Lee Greenwood albums
Vocal duet albums
MCA Records albums
Albums produced by Tom Collins (record producer)